The 1972 Miami Hurricanes football team represented the University of Miami as an independent during the 1972 NCAA University Division football season. Led by second-year head coach Fran Curci, the Hurricanes played their home games at the Miami Orange Bowl in Miami, Florida. Miami finished the season with a record of 5–6.

Schedule

References

Miami
Miami Hurricanes football seasons
Miami Hurricanes football